The women's long jump at the 1950 European Athletics Championships was held in Brussels, Belgium, at Heysel Stadium on 24 August 1950.

Medalists

Results

Final
24 August

Participation
According to an unofficial count, 14 athletes from 7 countries participated in the event.

 (1)
 (3)
 (1)
 (3)
 (1)
 (3)
 (2)

References

Long jump
Long jump at the European Athletics Championships
Euro